Vohimanitra is a town and commune in Madagascar. It belongs to the district of Manakara, which is a part of Vatovavy-Fitovinany Region. The population of the commune was estimated to be approximately 6,000 in 2001 commune census.

Only primary schooling is available. Farming and raising livestock provides employment for 47.5% and 47.5% of the working population. The most important crops are coffee and rice, while other important agricultural products are sugarcane and cassava. Services provide employment for 5% of the population.

Geography
It lies at the Faraony River.

References and notes 

Populated places in Vatovavy-Fitovinany